"Illumination Theory" is a song by the progressive metal/rock band Dream Theater. The song was released on 23 September 2013, as the closing track of the band's 12th album Dream Theater. It features a string ensemble conducted and arranged by Eren Başbuğ. The song's lyrics, according to the guitarist John Petrucci, are about things for which people will live, die or kill. The song's length is 22:17, making it Dream Theater's fifth longest to date.

The entire song was released as a 12" picture disc exclusively for Record Store Day 2014 and limited to 2,700 copies.

Segments 
 I. "Paradoxe de la Lumière Noire" (instrumental)
 II. "Live, Die, Kill"
 III. "The Embracing Circle" (instrumental)
 IV. "The Pursuit of Truth"
 V. "Surrender, Trust & Passion"

The song properly ends at 19:17, leading to a 30-second silence followed by a hidden track consisting of an electric guitar and piano instrumental, clocking the song out at 22:17.

Personnel
Dream Theater
James LaBrie – lead vocals
John Petrucci – guitar, backing vocals, producer
Jordan Rudess – keyboards, Continuum, GeoSynth App
John Myung – bass guitar
Mike Mangini – drums, percussion

String ensemble
Violin I – Misha Gutenberg (concert master), Larisa Vollis
Violin II – Yelena Khaimova, Yevgeniy Mansurov
Viola – Aleksandr Anisimov, Noah Wallace
Cello – Anastasia Golenisheva, Valeriya Sholokhova
Contrabass – Len Sluetsky

Production
Eren Başbuğ – orchestral arrangements, conducting

References 

Dream Theater songs
2013 songs
Songs written by John Petrucci